A - B - C - D - E - F - G - H - I - J - K - L - M - N - O - P - Q - R - S - T - U - V - W - XYZ

This is a list of rivers in the United States that have names starting with the letter A.  For the main page, which includes links to listings by state, see List of rivers in the United States.

Ab - Al 
Aberjona River - Massachusetts
Abiqua Creek - Oregon
Abita River - Louisiana
Acushnet River - Massachusetts
Agawam River - Massachusetts
Agua Fria River - Arizona
Ahnapee River - Wisconsin
Alabama River - Alabama
Alafia River - Florida
Alagnak River - Alaska
Alameda Creek - California
Alamo River - California
Alamosa River - Colorado
Alapaha River - Georgia, Florida
Alatna River - Alaska
Albion River - California
Alcovy River - Georgia
Alexander Creek - Alaska
Aliso Creek (Los Angeles County) - California
Aliso Creek (Orange County) - California
Allagash River - Maine
Allegheny River - Pennsylvania, New York
Alligator River - North Carolina
Alsea River - Oregon
Alsek River - Alaska
Altamaha River - Georgia
Alum Creek - Ohio

Am - An 
Amargosa River - California, Nevada
American Fork - Utah
American River - California
American River - Washington
Americano Creek - California
Amite River - Mississippi, Louisiana
Ammonoosuc River - New Hampshire
Amnicon River - Wisconsin
Anacostia River - Maryland, District of Columbia
Anahulu River - Hawaii
Anaktuvuk River - Alaska
Anclote River - Florida
Anderson River - Indiana
Andreafsky River - Alaska
Androscoggin River - New Hampshire, Maine
Angelina River - Texas
Aniak River - Alaska
Aniakchak River - Alaska
Animas River - Colorado, New Mexico
Anna River - Michigan
Annaquatucket River - Rhode Island
Annisquam River - Massachusetts
Antietam Creek - Pennsylvania, Maryland
Antoine Creek - Louisiana
Antoine River - Arkansas
Anvik River - Alaska

Ap - Ar 
Apalachicola River - Florida
Apple River - Wisconsin, Illinois
Apple River - Wisconsin
Applegate River - Oregon
Appomattox River - Virginia
Appoquinimink River - Delaware
Aransas River - Texas
Ararat River - Virginia, North Carolina
Arikaree River - Colorado, Kansas, Nebraska
Arkansas River - Colorado, Kansas, Oklahoma, Arkansas
Armstrong Creek - Pennsylvania
Armstrong Creek - West Virginia
Arnold Creek - West Virginia
Aroostook River - Maine
Arrow Creek - Montana
Arroyo de en Medio - California
Arroyo Seco - California
Arroyo Trabuco - California
Artichoke River - Minnesota

As - Aw 
Ashaway River - Rhode Island
Ashepoo River - South Carolina
Ashippun River - Wisconsin
Ashley River - South Carolina
Ashtabula River - Ohio
Ashuelot River - New Hampshire
Assabet River - Massachusetts
Assonet River - Massachusetts
Atchafalaya River - Louisiana
Au Sable River - Michigan
Aucilla River - Florida
Auglaize River - Ohio
Ausable River - New York
Awuna River - Alaska

A